The women's heptathlon event at the 2015 Asian Athletics Championships was held on June 3 and 4.

Medalists

Results

100 metres hurdles
Wind:Heat 1: –0.7 m/s, Heat 2: –0.9 m/s

High jump

Shot put

200 metres
Wind:Heat 1: 0.0 m/s, Heat 2: –0.4 m/s

Long jump

Javelin throw

800 metres

Final standings

References

Heptathlon
Combined events at the Asian Athletics Championships
2011 in women's athletics